Christopher Bergland is an American athlete, political activist, and writer.

Career 
Bergland is a three-time champion of the Triple Iron Man, the longest known non-stop triathlon with a  bicycle section,  swim, and a  run. He is known for being a world-class athlete and one of the "world's greatest openly gay athletes".

Bergland is an author of the book The Athlete's Way, in which he offers lessons, advice and strategies about becoming and staying fit.

Personal life 
Bergland and his wife had a daughter in 2007. He resides in both Provincetown, Massachusetts and San Francisco.

References 

Living people
Year of birth missing (living people)
Place of birth missing (living people)
Nationality missing
American male long-distance runners
American LGBT writers
American LGBT sportspeople
20th-century American writers
21st-century American writers
Gay sportsmen
LGBT triathletes
21st-century American LGBT people